Anka Pogačnik (born 23 December 1991) is a Slovenian judoka.

She is the -70 kg gold medallist of the 2021 Judo Grand Prix Zagreb.

References

External links

1991 births
Living people
Slovenian female judoka
Judoka at the 2015 European Games
Judoka at the 2019 European Games
European Games medalists in judo
European Games bronze medalists for Slovenia
Competitors at the 2022 Mediterranean Games
Mediterranean Games competitors for Slovenia
21st-century Slovenian women